Hapoel Merom HaGalil is an Israeli football club based in the Merom HaGalil Regional Council. The club currently plays in Liga Gimel Upper Galilee division.

History
The club was established in 2013 and was placed in the Upper Galilee division of Liga Gimel. The players are locals to the regional council, Jewish, Druze and Circassians.

In the club's first season in Liga Gimel, the team was ranked 12th in the league and was eliminated from the 2013–14 after losing to Hapoel Nahariya in the second round.

External links
Hapoel Merom HaGalil  Israel Football Association

References

Merom HaGalil
Merom HaGalil